The Roman Catholic Diocese of São Raimundo Nonato is a Latin suffragan diocese in the Ecclesiastical province of the metropolitan Teresina, in northeastern Brazil's Piauí state.

Its cathedral episcopal see is Catedral São Raimundo, located in the city of São Raimundo Nonato.

In 2010, the diocese had an area of 39,316 square kilometres; a total population of 193,000; a Catholic population of 174,000; 23 priests; and 42 religious.

History 
 Established on 17 December 1960 as Territorial Prelature of São Raimundo Nonato, on territory split off from the Territorial Prelature of Bom Jesus do Piauí
 Promoted on 3 October 1981 as Diocese of São Raimundo Nonato.

Ordinaries 

Territorial (Bishop-)Prelates of São Raimundo Nonato 
 Amadeu González Ferreiros, Mercederians (O. de M.) (1961.12.23 – retired 1967.12.28), Titular Bishop of Metræ (1963.02.18 – death 1995.03.20)
 Cândido Lorenzo González, O. de M. (1969.12.05 – 1981.10.03 see below, promoted as first bishop), Titular Bishop of Skradin (1969.12.05 – 1978.05.26)Bishops of São Raimundo Nonato 
 Cândido Lorenzo González, O. de M. (see above'' 1981.10.03 – retired 2002.07.17)
 Pedro Brito Guimarães (2002.07.17 – 2010.10.20), later Metropolitan Archbishop of Palmas (Brazil) (2010.10.20 – ...)
 João Santos Cardoso (2011.12.14 - 2015.06.24), later Bishop of Bom Jesus da Lapa (Brazil) (2015.06.24 – ...)
 Eduardo Zielski (March 2, 2016 – Present)

References

Sources and external links
 GCatholic.org, with incumbent bio links
 Catholic Hierarchy
 Diocese website (Portuguese) 

Roman Catholic dioceses in Brazil
Christian organizations established in 1960
Roman Catholic Ecclesiastical Province of Teresina
Roman Catholic dioceses and prelatures established in the 20th century
1960 establishments in Brazil